Paul Van Halteren (23 July 1898 – 4 January 1949) was a sailor from Belgium, who represented his country at the 1924 Summer Olympics in Le Havre, France.

References

Sources
 
 

Belgian male sailors (sport)
Sailors at the 1924 Summer Olympics – 8 Metre
Olympic sailors of Belgium
1898 births
1949 deaths